In medicine, the number needed to harm (NNH) is an epidemiological measure that indicates how many persons on average need to be exposed to a risk factor over a specific period to cause harm in an average of one person who would not otherwise have been harmed. Intuitively, the lower the number needed to harm, the worse the risk factor, with 1 meaning that every exposed person is harmed.

NNH is similar to number needed to treat (NNT), where NNT usually refers to a positive therapeutic result and NNH to a detrimental effect or risk factor. A combined measure, the number needed to treat for an additional beneficial or harmful outcome (NNTB/H), is also used.

Relevance 
The NNH is an important measure in evidence-based medicine and helps physicians decide whether it is prudent to proceed with a particular treatment which may expose the patient to harms while providing therapeutic benefits.  If a clinical endpoint is devastating enough without the drug (e.g. death, heart attack), drugs with a low NNH may still be indicated in particular situations if the NNT is smaller than the NNH. However, there are several important problems with the NNH, involving bias and lack of reliable confidence intervals, as well as difficulties in excluding the possibility of no difference between two treatments or groups.

Numerical example

References

Drug discovery
Epidemiology
Evidence-based medicine
Medical statistics